Feras and the alternative transliteration Firas is a given name and surname. Notable people with the name include:

Feras
Feras Antoon (born 1975), Syrian-born Canadian businessman mainly in pornographic materials
Feras Esmaeel (born 1983), Syrian football player
Feras Fayyad (born 1984), Syrian film director
Feras Hatoum, Lebanese journalist
Feras Kilani (born 1976), Palestinian-British journalist
Feras Saied (1981-2015), Syrian bodybuilder
Feras Saleh (born 1989), Jordanian football player
Feras Shelbaieh (born 1993), Jordanian football player
Feras Taleb (born 1977), Jordanian football player]

Abu Firas
 Abu Firas al-Hamdani (932–968), Arab prince and poet
 Abu Firas al-Suri, birth name Radwan Nammous (1950–2016), senior official in the al-Qaeda affiliated al-Nusra Front

Firas
 Princess Dana Firas (born 1970), Jordanian princess
 Firas Al Ali (born 1985), Syrian footballer
 Firas Atallah, Canadian entrepreneur, a founder of SSENSE
 Firas al-Buraikan (born 2000), Saudi Arabian footballer
 Firas Chaieb (born 1992), Qatari handball player 
 Firas Chaouat (born 1996), Tunisian footballer 
 Firass Dirani (born 1984), Australian actor
 Firas Al-Ghamdi (born 1999), Saudi Arabian footballer
 Firas Irwan (born 2001), Singaporean footballer 
 Firas Kashosh (born 1976), Syrian footballer
 Firas Katoussi (born 1995), Tunisian taekwondo practitioner
 Firas Al-Khatib (born 1983), Syrian footballer
 Firas Ben Larbi (born 1996), Tunisian footballer 
 Firas Mugrabi (born 1991), Arab-Israeli footballer
 Firas al-Sawwah (born 1941), Syrian writer
 Firas Tlass (born 1960), Syrian businessman

Firass
 Firass Dirani (born 1984), Australian actor

See also 
 Firas (disambiguation)